DisneyNow (stylized as DisneyNOW) is an online TV Everywhere app and website/URL for Disney Channel, Disney Junior, and Disney XD. It launched on September 29, 2017, replacing the individual "Watch" apps that originally launched for these networks in 2012, as well as the networks' respective official websites.

History
Disney first launched TV Everywhere services for Disney Channel, Disney Junior, and Disney XD in June 2012—the "Watch" apps—as part of new carriage agreements with Comcast Xfinity that included digital rights to the programming of Disney's cable channels via authenticated streaming.

In February 2017, during upfronts presentations for its children's channels, Disney announced that the individual Watch Disney Channel, Watch Disney Junior, and Watch Disney XD apps would be replaced by a new service known as DisneyNOW. The new service combines the content of all three services, along with Radio Disney, into a unified library. The new application also includes games based on programs from the three channels, a profile system, and parental controls that can lock the app to Disney Junior only. The new apps launched in late-September 2017 for Android, iOS, Apple TV, and Roku. Web, Android TV, and Amazon Fire TV versions were released in 2018. On December 1, 2018, Chinese animated series Stitch & Ai, a spin-off of the Lilo & Stitch franchise that originally aired in 2017, made its United States debut on DisneyNOW, with twelve of the series's 13 episodes released on the service.

With the launch of the subscription streaming service Disney+ in November 2019, Disney began to remove library content from DisneyNOW  including Mickey Mouse Clubhouse, That's So Raven, The Suite Life of Zack & Cody, Phineas and Ferb, Gravity Falls, The Proud Family, and Andi Mack, as well as older seasons of shows like Raven's Home, Bunk'd, Big City Greens, and DuckTales in order to encourage subscription to the service.

See also 
Disney+
WatchESPN
Philo

References

External links
 

Disney Media Networks
Subscription video on demand services
Internet television streaming services
2017 introductions